The following is a list of things named after Werner Karl Heisenberg:

 Euler–Heisenberg Lagrangian
 Heisenberg commutation relation 
 Heisenberg cut 
 Heisenberg ferromagnet
 Heisenberg group
Heisenberg algebra
 Heisenberg–Langevin equations
 Heisenberg limit
 Heisenberg's microscope
 Heisenberg model (classical)
 Heisenberg model (quantum)
 Heisenberg picture
Heisenberg equation of motion
 Heisenberg uncertainty principle
 Kramers–Heisenberg formula

Other
 Heisenberg affair, a political affair in the 1930s involving Heisenberg
 Heisenbug, in computer programming
 Werner Heisenberg Memorial Lecture
 Werner Heisenberg Gymnasium in Leverkusen, Germany
 Werner Heisenberg Gymnasium in Leipzig, Germany
 Heisenberg-Gesellschaft e.V., München, founded 2012
 Heisenberg Institute College in Bogota, Colombia.

In popular culture
 Heisenberg compensator, in the Star Trek fictional universe.
 The AMC television series Breaking Bad features a chemistry teacher turned drug producer, named Walter White, who uses the name "Heisenberg" as his pseudonym in tribute to the scientist.
 The Eyes of Heisenberg by Frank Herbert
 The Heisenberg Device, a version of the atomic bomb used by Nazi Germany in the alternate history T.V. series The Man in the High Castle.
 In the video game expansion The Sims 3: Into the Future, there is a Nanite (a collectible in-game item) called the Heisenberg Nanite.
 In the video game Resident Evil Village, there is a character named Karl Heisenberg who uses magnetic powers to antagonize the protagonist, Ethan Winters. Heisenberg also owns a factory, in which he conducts experiments and creates bioorganic weapons.
 Heisenberg is also a supporting character in the comic spinoff, Assassin's Creed: Conspiracies.
 Heisenberg is also one of the recurring characters of the comic, Quantonium, codenamed Wielder.

Notes

H
Werner Heisenberg